Ballingry Rovers Football Club were a Scottish junior football club based in Glencraig, Fife. Their home ground was Ore Park.

The club was founded in 1952 by Mr Andrew and Mrs Janet Clark of Ballingry Road with the aid of Jean Coron, originally playing at the King George VI Park in Crosshill.  A successful amateur side for many years, the club stepped up to the junior grade in 2004. Their record in ten years of junior football was P 396, W 171, D 69, L 156, F 780, A 725.

The SJFA restructured prior to the 2006–07 season, and Rovers found themselves in the twelve-team East Region, Central Division. They finished third in their first season in the division and won the championship the following campaign.

The team were managed between October 2014 and their demise by former Aberdeen defender Willie Garner.

They were wound up in 2014 following profligate spending.

Honours

SJFA East Region Central Division

 Winner: 2007–08

References

Defunct football clubs in Scotland
Scottish Junior Football Association clubs
Association football clubs established in 1952
Football clubs in Fife
1952 establishments in Scotland
Association football clubs disestablished in 2014
2014 disestablishments in Scotland